Anne de Noailles, 1st Duke of Noailles (died 15 February 1678) was the great-grandson of Antoine, 1st comte de Noailles.  He played an important part in the Fronde and the early years of the reign of Louis XIV, became captain-general of the newly won province of Roussillon, and in 1663 was created duc de Noailles and peer of France.

Two of Noailles' sons, Anne-Jules, 2nd duc de Noailles, and Louis-Antoine, Cardinal de Noailles, raised the Noailles family to its greatest fame. A grandson married Françoise Charlotte d'Aubigné, niece of Madame de Maintenon.

Notes

References
 

Dukes of Noailles
Noailles, Anne of
Anne
Year of birth missing
1678 deaths
17th-century peers of France
Peers created by Louis XIV